The 1994 Kloster Thailand Open was a professional ranking snooker tournament that took place between 4–16 March 1994 at the Imperial Queens Park Hotel in Bangkok, Thailand.

James Wattana won the tournament by defeating Steve Davis 9–7 in the final. Dave Harold was the defending champion, having won the tournament the previous year under its previous name, but he was eliminated in the last 16 by Joe Swail.


Wildcard round

Main draw

References

1994 in snooker